Stephen Field may refer to:

 Stephen Johnson Field (1816–1899), United States Supreme Court justice
 Steve Field (medical doctor) (born 1959), British medical professor
 Steve Field (sculptor) (born 1954), English sculptor, muralist and mosaicist
 Steve Field, actor in Blonde Dolly

See also
 Stephen Fields (1879–1949), American tug-of-war Olympian